Bálint Korpási (born 30 March 1987) is a Hungarian Greco-Roman wrestler competing in the 72 kg division. He won gold medal in 2016 world championships in Budapest.

In 2020, he won the gold medal in the 72 kg event at the 2020 Individual Wrestling World Cup held in Belgrade, Serbia. In March 2021, he qualified at the European Qualification Tournament to compete at the 2020 Summer Olympics in Tokyo, Japan. He competed in the 67 kg event.

References

External links 
 

1987 births
Hungarian male sport wrestlers
World Wrestling Championships medalists
Living people
Place of birth missing (living people)
European Wrestling Championships medalists
Wrestlers at the 2020 Summer Olympics
Olympic wrestlers of Hungary
20th-century Hungarian people
21st-century Hungarian people